Hitchmough is a surname. Notable people with the surname include:

 Jim Hitchmough (1934–1997), TV comedy writer, teacher, and academic
 John Hitchmough (born 1958), English cricketer 
 John Hitchmough (born 1962), English cricketer